Vojtěch Plát (born 23 January 1994) is a Czech chess grandmaster. He won the Czech Chess Championship in 2016.

Chess career
Born in 1994, Plát earned his international master title in 2009 and his grandmaster title in 2017. He won the Czech Chess Championship in 2016 and 2021. 

In 2019, he won the O Losinskeho Kapra in Kouty nad Desnou, Czech Republic with a score of 8/9 points.

He is the No. 10 ranked Czech player as of July 2020.

References

External links

1994 births
Living people
Chess grandmasters
Czech chess players
People from Rychnov nad Kněžnou